Ś (minuscule: ś or ſ́) is a letter of the Latin alphabet, formed from S with the addition of an acute accent. It is used in Polish and Montenegrin alphabets, and in certain other languages:

 Slavic languages – usually the palatalized form of /s/
 Polish language –  (voiceless alveolo-palatal fricative)
 Montenegrin language – [ɕ]; Cyrillic letter: С́
 In the Belarusian Łacinka for сь 
 In the Ukrainian Latynka for сь 
 Lower Sorbian language – 
 Indo-Aryan:  voiceless postalveolar fricative
 Transliteration of Sanskrit and modern Indic languages: see the International Alphabet of Sanskrit Transliteration 
 Romani alphabet
 Ladin language – word-initial [z] (in Anpezo dialect it represents [z] in all positions) 
 In some dialects of the Emilian language – 
 transliteration of a palatalized s in the Lydian language
 In Proto-Semitic,  a reconstructed voiceless lateral fricative phoneme , the parent phoneme of Ge'ez Śawt ሠ.
 a sibilant phoneme of the earliest phase of the Sumerian language.
 transliteration of a letter of the Etruscan alphabet, related to San and Tsade.
 a sibilant phoneme of the ancient Iberian language.

Encodings

The HTML codes are:
&#346; for Ś (upper case)
&#347; for ś (lower case)

The Unicode codepoints are U+015A for Ś and U+015B for ś.

See also

 С́
 Š
 sz (digraph)
 Ź

Latin letters with diacritics
Polish letters with diacritics